Alexis-Xyste Bernard (December 29, 1847 – June 17, 1923) was Bishop of St. Hyacinthe, Canada.

The Institute of the Sisters of St. Joseph of St. Hyacinthe, founded by Louis-Zéphirin Moreau, owes to him their organization, and formation as a teaching body.

Life

Bernard made his classical and theological studies under the Sulpician Fathers in Montreal, and was ordained priest 1 October 1871. After a year as curate he became successively President of Sorel College, Canon of the Cathedral, Archdeacon, Secretary for the diocese, Vicar-General, Provost of the Chapter, and Prothonotary Apostolic. After the death of Bishop Moreau, in 1901, Mgr. Bernard was continued in the office of Vicar-General by Bishop Maxime Decelles, and, when the latter died, in 1905, was elected Vicar-Capitular.

He declined the See of St. Hyacinth on the plea of his enfeebled health, until he received from Pope Pius X a peremptory order to accept. He was consecrated 15 February 1906.

Works

Besides "Synodal Decrees", and a summary of the "Clerical Conference", Bernard edited the "Pastoral Letters" of the bishops of the diocese, in nine volumes.

See also

Notes

1847 births
1923 deaths
Roman Catholic bishops of Saint-Hyacinthe
People from Beloeil, Quebec